Leucosyrinx canyonensis is a species of small predatory sea snail, a marine gastropod mollusc in the family Pseudomelatomidae, the turrids and allies.

Distribution
This marine species is endemic to New Zealand and occurs off South Island.

References

 Powell A. W. B., New Zealand Mollusca, William Collins Publishers Ltd, Auckland, New Zealand 1979 
 Spencer, H.G., Marshall, B.A. & Willan, R.C. (2009). Checklist of New Zealand living Mollusca. Pp 196-219. in: Gordon, D.P. (ed.) New Zealand inventory of biodiversity. Volume one. Kingdom Animalia: Radiata, Lophotrochozoa, Deuterostomia. Canterbury University Press, Christchurch.

External links
  Spencer H.G., Willan R.C., Marshall B.A. & Murray T.J. (2011). Checklist of the Recent Mollusca Recorded from the New Zealand Exclusive Economic Zone
 

canyonensis
Gastropods of New Zealand
Gastropods described in 1956